Lesbian, gay, bisexual, transgender (LGBT) rights in Italy significantly advanced in the 21st century, although LGBT people still face various legal challenges not experienced by non-LGBT residents. According to ILGA-Europe's 2021 report, the status of LGBT rights in Italy is the worst among Western European countries – such as still legally banning same-sex marriage, no discrimination protections for goods and services and also lacking any parental rights for same-sex couples within adoption and IVF.

In Italy, both male and female same-sex sexual activity has been legal since 1890, when a new Penal Code was promulgated. A civil union law was passed in May 2016, providing same-sex couples with many of the rights of marriage. Stepchild adoption was, however, excluded from the bill, and it is currently a matter of judicial debate. The same law provides both same-sex and heterosexual couples which live in an unregistered cohabitation with several legal rights.

Transgender people have been allowed to legally change their gender since 1982. Although discrimination regarding sexual orientation in employment has been banned since 2003, no other anti-discrimination laws regarding sexual orientation or gender identity and expression have been enacted nationwide, although some Italian regions have enacted far more comprehensive anti-discrimination laws. In February 2016, days after the Senate approved the civil union law, a new poll showed a large majority in favour of civil unions (69%) and a majority for same-sex marriage (56%), but only a minority approving of stepchild adoption and LGBT parenting (37%).

LGBT history in Italy

Italian unification in 1861 brought together a number of States which had all (with the exception of two) abolished punishment for private, non-commercial and homosexual acts between consenting adults as a result of the Napoleonic Code. One of the two exceptions had been the Kingdom of Sardinia which punished homosexual acts between men (although not women) under articles 420–425 of the Penal Code promulgated in 1859 by Victor Emmanuel II. With unification, the former Kingdom of Sardinia extended its own criminalizing legislation to the rest of the newly born Kingdom of Italy. However, this legislation did not apply to the former Kingdom of the Two Sicilies, taking into account the "particular characteristics of those that lived in the south".

This bizarre situation, where homosexuality was illegal in one part of the kingdom, but legal in another, was only reconciled in 1889, with the promulgation of the Zanardelli Code which abolished all differences in treatment between homosexual and heterosexual relations across the entire territory of Italy. This Penal Code became effective in 1890, and there have since been no laws against private, adult and consensual homosexual relations.

This situation remained in place despite the fascist promulgation of 19 October 1930 of the Rocco Code. This was to avoid discussion of the issue completely, in order to avoid creating a public scandal. Repression was a matter for the Catholic Church, and not the Italian State. This did not, however, prevent the fascist authorities from targeting male homosexual behaviour with administrative punishment, such as public admonition and confinement; gays were persecuted in the later years of the regime of Benito Mussolini, and under the Italian Social Republic of 1943–45.

The arrangements of the Rocco Code have remained in place over subsequent decades, namely, the principle that homosexual conduct is an issue of morality and religion, and not criminal sanctions by the State. However, during the post-war period, there have been at least three attempts to re-criminalise it. Such attitudes have made it difficult to bring discussion of measures, for example to recognise homosexual relationships, to the parliamentary sphere.

Legality of same-sex sexual activity
Same-sex sexual activity has been legal since 1890. The age of consent is 14 years old, regardless of gender and sexual orientation.

Recognition of same-sex relationships

At present, while same-sex couples cannot marry, they can access civil unions, enacted in 2016, which provide several of the rights, benefits and obligations of marriage. These benefits include, amongst others, shared property, social security and inheritance.

Since the 2005 regional elections, many Italian regions governed by centre-left coalitions have passed resolutions in support of French-style PACS (civil unions), including Tuscany, Umbria, Emilia-Romagna, Campania, Marche, Veneto, Apulia, Lazio, Liguria, Abruzzo and Sicily. Lombardy, led by the centre-right House of Freedoms, officially declared their opposition to any recognition of same-sex relationships. All these actions, however, are merely symbolic as regions do not have legislative power on the matter.

Despite the fact that several bills on civil unions or the recognition of rights to unregistered couples had been introduced into the Parliament in the twenty years prior to 2016, none had been approved owing to the strong opposition from the social conservative members of Parliament belonging to both coalitions. On 8 February 2007, the Government led by Romano Prodi introduced a bill, which would have granted rights in areas of labour law, inheritance, taxation and health care to same-sex and opposite-sex unregistered partnerships. The bill was never made a priority of Parliament and was eventually dropped when a new parliament was elected after the Prodi Government lost a confidence vote.

In 2010, the Constitutional Court issued a landmark ruling which recognized same-sex couples as a "legitimate social formation, similar to and deserving homogeneous treatment as marriage". Since that ruling, the Supreme Court of Cassation (the supreme and last revision court in most matters) remanded a decision by a Justice of the Peace who had rejected a residence permit to an Algerian citizen, married in Spain to a Spaniard of the same sex.

On 21 July 2015, the European Court of Human Rights ruled that in not recognizing any form of civil union or same-sex marriage, the country was violating international human rights.

On 2 February 2016, Italian senators started to debate a same-sex civil unions bill. On 25 February 2016, the bill was approved by the Senate in a 173–71 vote. The bill was then sent to the Chamber of Deputies where it passed on 11 May 2016, with 372 votes in favour, 51 against and 99 abstentions. In order to ensure swift passage of the bill, Prime Minister Matteo Renzi had earlier declared it a confidence vote saying it was "unacceptable to have any more delays after years of failed attempts." The civil unions law provides same-sex couples with all the rights of marriage (while not allowing same-sex marriage), however, provisions allowing for stepchild or joint adoption were stricken from an earlier version of the bill. Italian President Sergio Mattarella signed the bill into law on 20 May 2016. It took effect on 5 June 2016.

In 2017, the Italian Supreme Court allowed a marriage between two women, which was performed in neighboring France, to be officially recognised. However, in May 2018, the Court of Cassation ruled that same-sex marriages performed abroad cannot be recognized in Italy. Instead, they must be registered as civil unions, regardless of whether the couple wed before or after Italy introduced civil unions in 2016.

On 10 May 2022, Gian Marco Centinaio, Vice President of the Senate and member of the League, said the centre-right majority would "start looking into Scalfarotto's bill [to introduce same-sex marriage], adding "I think society progresses, and I believe we must go forwards and not backwards". Since then however neither Parliament nor the Government have taken action in that direction, and Centinaio himself later he claimed he still opposed same-sex marriage and that his words were misunderstood.

Adoption and parenting 

Adoption and foster care are regulated by the Legge 184/1983. Adoption is in principle permitted only to married couples who must be of the opposite sex. According to Italian law, there are no restrictions on foster care. In a limited number of situations, the law provides for "adoption in particular cases" by a single person, however, and this has been interpreted by some courts, including on the appeal court level, to include the possibility of stepchild adoption for unmarried (opposite-sex and same-sex) couples.

On 11 January 2013, the Court of Cassation upheld a lower decision of court which granted the sole custody of a child to a lesbian mother. The father of the child complained about the "homosexual relationship of the mother". The Supreme Court rejected the father's appeal because it was not argued properly.
 
Several individual cases where same-sex couples have been allowed to legally adopt or foster children have occurred over the years. On 15 November 2013, it was reported that the Court of Bologna chose a same-sex couple to foster a three-year-old child. On 1 March 2016, a Rome family court approved a lesbian couple's request to simultaneously adopt each other's daughters. From 2014 to 2016, the Rome Family Court made at least 15 rulings upholding requests for gay people to be allowed to adopt their partners' children. On 29 April 2016, Marilena Grassadonia, president of the Rainbow Families Association, won the right to adopt her wife's twin boys. The possibility of stepchild adoption was confirmed by the Court of Cassation in a decision published on 22 June 2016.

In February 2017, the Trento Court of Appeals recognized both male same-sex partners as fathers of two children born with the help of an egg donor and a surrogate mother in Canada. The decision was challenged ln late 2017 by local officials and the Ministry of the Interior. In May 2019, the Court of Cassation ruled that the fathers cannot both be named on the children's Italian birth certificates. Instead, only the biological father will be listed as their legal parent, while his partner will have to apply for special permission to become their adoptive father, despite the fact that both men are named on the children's Canadian birth certificates.

In March 2017, the Florence Court for Minors recognised a foreign adoption by a same-sex couple. The Milan Court of Appeal also recognised a foreign same-sex adoption in June 2017.

In January 2018, after a surrogate mother gave birth to twin boys for a same-sex couple in California, Milan officials refused to register the boys as both the fathers' children. At first, a judge ruled against the couple, who later appealed; a higher court held that since each man's sperm was used to fertilise eggs from the same donor and one of each was implanted into the surrogate, both men would be able to register the birth of their own child and become its legal parent. The twins cannot be recognised as children of the couple, however, and the fathers could not adopt each other's non-biological son. Although not legally brothers, both boys have been given the same surname. Despite this contradiction, LGBT association Famiglie Arcobaleno, has welcomed the court's decision as a "positive step".

In April 2018, a lesbian couple in Turin was permitted by city officials to register their son, born through IVF, as the child of both parents. Two other same-sex couples also had their children officially registered. A few days later, a same-sex couple in Rome was similarly allowed to register their daughter.

On 2 June 2018, the day after becoming the new Family and the Disabled Minister, Lorenzo Fontana said same-sex families "don't exist". He denied making homophobic comments, saying he was not "against gays", and adding "I have many homosexual friends… after all I lived in Brussels for many years where there are many gay people in powerful positions... I am Catholic, I do not hide it. And that's why I believe that the family is the natural one, where a child must have a mother and a father". This led to protests from LGBT activists, who used the hashtag #NoiEsistiamo (#WeExist) on social media to share photos of their same-sex families.

In 2021 Italy recognized the adoptions abroad by same-sex couples because they were judged to be non-obstructive for the purposes of the adoption itself.

As of 2022 the situation turned more complicated and with mixed results, especially after a Ministry of Interior Affairs’s Circulaire specifically forbade municipalities from automatically registering homosexual couples’ children’s abroad birth certificates with the name of both parents. The Ministry tried, in this way, to fill the loophole used by left-wing mayors to help gay couples. Mayors and administrative personnel could face charges for “abuse of office”. In this way, sentences by a court (that cannot be limited by government without a clear rule on the matter) remains the only safe way to adopt and/or obtain results.

In September 2022 a court in Rome ruled that the government's requirement that children's ID cards list their "mother" and "father" discriminated against same-sex parents and ordered the government to issue documents that correctly identify the parents. The ruling is permanent, but only applied to this specific case. Unless and until the government changes the rules around ID cards, other parents will have to sue for correct identification as well.

On March 13, 2023, the city of Milan, which had been registering kids from same sex parents independently to bypass anti-LGBT restrictions in the national law, stopped issuing birth certificates to the children of same-sex couples after Prime Minister Georgia Meloni's far-right government sent the city's administration a letter containing a ruling by the Italian Supreme Court which said a court approval was required for legal recognition of parental status. As a result of that, children with no birth registration can be denied inheritance, healthcare and child support rights, among other things, or ultimately become orphans and be put up for adoption to other parents by the government under Italian law.

Discrimination protections

Employment discrimination 
Since July 2003, discrimination on the basis of sexual orientation in employment has been illegal throughout the whole country, in conformity with European Union directives. The Implementation of Directive 2000/78/EC on equal treatment in employment and occupation prohibits unfair discrimination in employment and recruitment processes. One of the most famous convictions under the directive was that of lawyer Carlo Taormina, who in July 2013 during a radio interview declared that he would never hire a gay man in his law firm. The Tribunal of Bergamo condemned Taormina to a payment of 10,000 euros and ordered the publication of the ruling on a national newspaper at his expense. 

Italian law is mostly silent on the matter of discrimination on the basis of gender identity. However, on 15 January, 2023, a court in Rome ruled against a school who had fired a professore due her being transgender, forcing it to compensate her.

Hate crimes and hate speech 
In 2002, Franco Grillini introduced legislation that would modify article III of the Italian Constitution to prohibit discrimination based on sexual orientation. It was not successful.

In 2006, Grillini again introduced a proposal to expand anti-discrimination laws, this time adding gender identity as well as sexual orientation. It received less support than the previous one had.

In 2008, Danilo Giuffrida was awarded 100,000 euros compensation after having been ordered to re-take his driving test by the Italian Ministry of Infrastructure and Transport due to his sexuality; the judge said that the Ministry of Transport was in clear breach of anti-discrimination laws.

In 2009, the Chamber of Deputies shelved a proposal against homophobic hate crimes that would have allowed increased sentences for violence against gay and bisexual individuals, approving the preliminary questions moved by Union of the Centre and supported by Lega Nord and The People of Freedom. Deputy Paola Binetti, who belongs to Democratic Party, also voted against party guidelines.

On 16 May 2013, a bill which would prohibit discrimination based on sexual orientation and gender identity was presented in a press conference by four deputies of four different parties. The bill is cosponsored by 221 MPs of the Chamber of Deputies, but no member of the center-right parties has pledged support. In addition to this bill, some deputies introduced another two bills. On 7 July, the Justice Committee advanced a unified bill.

The bill was amended in compliance of the request of some conservative MPs who were afraid of being fined or jailed for stating their opposition to the recognition of same-sex unions. On 5 August, the Chamber started to consider the bill. On 19 September 2013, the Chamber of Deputies passed the bill in a 228–58 vote (and 108 abstentions). On the same day, a controversial amendment passed, which would protect free speech for politicians and clergymen. On 29 April 2014, the Senate of the Republic began examining the bill. In 2019, the bill was still in the Senate Judicial Commission, being blocked by several hundred amendments from conservative MPs.

In July 2020, debate resumed on the proposal to extend anti-racism laws to outlaw discrimination and hate crimes against women, gay and transgender people, following a number of attacks in preceding months against LGBT people. It modifies an existing law punishing offenses based on someone's race or religion with up to four years in jail. The proposal was drafted by Alessandro Zan and supported by his ruling Democratic Party and opposed by the Lega, Brothers of Italy and the Italian bishops' conference.

Italy's lower house approved the bill on 4 November 2020 with 265 votes to 193 in the 630-member chamber. The bill died in the Senate on 27 October 2021 following a 131–154 secret ballot vote.

On 28 October 2021, the Chamber of Deputies approved in a 271–16 vote an infrastructure bill containing a provision which made advertisement containing homophobic or transphobic messages illegal to expose on streets or on vehicles. The bill was approved by the Senate as well on 4 November in a 190–34 vote. The bill was signed into law by Italian President of the Republic Sergio Mattarella on 9 November and became effective starting from 10 November.

Regional laws
In 2004, Tuscany became the first Italian region to ban discrimination based on sexual orientation and gender identity in the areas of employment, education, public services and accommodations. The Berlusconi Government challenged the new law in court, asserting that only the central Government had the right to pass such a law. The Constitutional Court overturned the provisions regarding accommodations (with respect to private homes and religious institutions), but otherwise upheld most of the legislation. Since then, the regions of Liguria (November 2009), Marche (February 2010), Sicily (March 2015), Piedmont (June 2016), Umbria (April 2017), Emilia-Romagna (July 2019) and Campania (August 2020) enacted similar measures.

Gender identity and expression
Cross-dressing is legal in Italy, and sex reassignment surgeries are also legal, with medical approval. However, gender identity is not mentioned in Italy's anti-discrimination law, meaning that transgender people may face discrimination in areas such as employment, access to goods and services, housing, education and health services.

There is a history of third genders in Italy, such as the Femminiello in traditional Neapolitan culture, as well as there being accounts of individuals spending significant portions of their life as genders other than the ones they were assigned at birth, such as Catterina Vizzani in the early-to-mid-1700s.

During the period of fascist rule in Italy from the 1920s to the 1940s, the penal code contained prohibitions against cross-dressing and trans people were targeted by police for arrests. The first documented Italian trans woman to undergo genital reconstruction surgery did so in Switzerland in 1967. However, on her return to Italy, she was detained and confined to a small village in the south of the country.

In 1982, Italy became the fourth nation in the world to recognise the right to change one's legal gender. Before Italy, only Sweden (1972), Chile (1974) and Germany (then-West Germany) (1980) recognised this right.

In 2006, a police officer was reportedly fired for cross-dressing in public while off duty.

The first transgender MP was Vladimir Luxuria, who was elected in 2006 as a representative of the Communist Refoundation Party. While she was not reelected, she went on to be the winner of a popular reality television show called L'Isola dei Famosi.

In 2005, a couple got legally married as husband and wife. Some years later, one of the parties transitioned as a transgender woman. In 2009, she was legally recognized as such according to the Italian law on transsexualism (Legge 14 aprile 1982, n. 164). Later, the couple discovered that their marriage had been dissolved because the couple became a same-sex couple, even though they did not ask a civil court to divorce. The law prescribes that when a transgender person is married to another person the couple should divorce, but in the case of the transgender woman mentioned above (Alessandra) and her wife, there was no will to divorce. The couple asked the Civil Court of Modena to nullify the order of dissolution of their marriage. On 27 October 2010, the court ruled in favour of the couple. The Italian Ministry of Interior appealed the decision, and the Court of Appeal of Bologna subsequently reversed the trial decision. The couple later appealed the decision to the Court of Cassation. On 6 June 2013, the Cassation asked the Constitutional Court whether the 1982 law was unconstitutional when it ordered the dissolution of marriage by applying the Legge 1 dicembre 1970, n. 898, which regulates divorces, even if the couple did not ask to do so. In 2014, the Constitutional Court finally ruled the case in favour of the couple, allowing them to remain married.

On 21 May 2015, the Court of Cassation ruled that sterilisation and sex reassignment surgery are not required in order to obtain a legal gender change.

On 15 February 2023, a Court in Trento ruled transgender minors could have  their legal gender changed on documents as long as their parents consent and a psychologist has been consulted on the matter.

Military service

Until 1986, "sexual deviance" was a reason for exclusion for military service. At that time, some men claimed to be homosexual to avoid the draft. Lesbians have never been banned from the Italian military since women were first allowed to serve in 2000. Since 2010, discrimination against gays and lesbians in military service is banned, but the situation for transgender people is unclear. The organization Polis Aperta estimates that 5 to 10% of Italians in uniformed service (military or police) are LGBT. Despite the ban on discrimination, some service personnel face harassment or violence because of their sexual orientation.

Blood donation
Gay and bisexual men have been allowed to donate blood since 2001.

LGBT rights groups and public campaigns 

The major national organization for LGBT rights in Italy is called Arcigay. It was founded in 1980, and has advocated for the recognition of same-sex couples and LGBT rights generally.

Some openly LGBT politicians include:
Vladimir Luxuria, first openly transgender member of Parliament in Europe, and the world's second openly transgender MP after New Zealander Georgina Beyer; former deputy for the Communist Refoundation Party.
Nichi Vendola, leader of Left Ecology Freedom and former President of Apulia.
Rosario Crocetta, former President of Sicily and a prominent figure in the Democratic Party.
Paola Concia, former member of the Chamber of Deputies for the Democratic Party.
Daniele Capezzone, former spokesperson for the People of Freedom party.
Franco Grillini, former member of the Chamber of Deputies for the Democrats of the Left.
Marco Pannella, former member of the European Parliament and leader of the Italian Radical Party (came out after retirement).
Alfonso Pecoraro Scanio, former Minister of Environment and first openly bisexual minister.
 Gianmarco Negri, mayor of Tromello, Province of Pavia and first transgender mayor in Italy.
 Elly Schlein, secretary of the Democratic Party (which is currently the largest opposition party in Parliament), openly bisexual woman and first openly LGBT leader of a major Italian party.

In 2007, an advert showing a baby wearing a wristband label that said "homosexual" caused controversy. The advert was part of a regional government campaign to combat anti-gay discrimination.

On 8 June 2019, the 25th edition of Roma Pride was held, with 700,000 people participating.

Living conditions
Prevailing social attitudes about LGBT issues tend to reflect traditional Catholic values concerning human sexuality and gender roles, with lower support compared to other Western European states. In 2020 LGBT activist and legislator Alessandro Zan described homophobia as widespread and often emerging whenever LGBT people tried to live their lives openly. In June 2020 a man walking with his boyfriend in Pescara was violently attacked by seven individuals, leaving him with severe injuries requiring jaw reconstructive surgery.  In September 2020 in Acerra a trans man was seriously injured and his fiancée, a cisgender woman, was killed by the woman's brother who wanted to “teach her” a lesson and rammed their motorcycle with his car.

Pride parades celebrating LGBTQ achievements and community take place in more than 30 towns and cities across Italy from mid-May to the end of September. Turin will host the next conference of the European Pride Organizers Association in 2022, the first time for an Italian city.

A number of Italian cities are recognised as gay-friendly destinations, including Naples, Catania, Rome, Palermo, Milan, Noto, Bologna, Taormina and Gallipoli.

Public opinion 

According to data from the 2010 Italy Eurispes report released 29 January, the percentage of Italians who have a positive attitude towards homosexuality and are in favor of legal recognition of gay and lesbian couples is growing.

According to a 2010 poll, 82% of Italians considered homosexuals equal to heterosexuals. 41% thought that same-sex couples should have the right to marry in a civil ceremony, and 20.4% agreed with civil unions only. In total, 61.4% were in favor of a form of legal recognition for gay and lesbian couples. This was an increase of 2.5% from the previous year (58.9%) and almost 10% in 7 years (51.6% in 2003). "This is further proof that Italians are ahead of their national institutions. Our Parliament hears more and more people on the issue and what it hears is to soon approve a law that guarantees gay people the opportunity to publicly recognize their families, as is done in 20 European countries," said the national president of Arcigay, Aurelio Mancuso.

A 2013 Pew Research Center opinion survey of various countries throughout the world showed that 74% of the Italian population believed that homosexuality should be accepted by society (the 8th highest of all the countries polled), while 18% believed it should not. Young people were generally more accepting: 86% of people between 18 and 29 were accepting of gay people, while 80% of people between 30 and 49 and 67% of people over 50 held the same belief. In a 2007 version of this survey, 65% of Italians were accepting of gay people, meaning that there was a net gain of 9% from 2007 to 2013 (the 4th highest gain in acceptance of gay people of the countries surveyed).

In December 2016, a survey was conducted by the Williams Institute in collaboration with IPSOS, in 23 countries (including Italy) on their attitudes towards transgender people. The study showed a relatively liberal attitude from Italians towards transgender people. According to the study, 78% of Italians supported allowing transgender people to change their gender on their legal documents (the 4th highest percentage of the countries surveyed), with 29% supporting the idea of allowing them to do so without any surgery or doctor's/government approval (the 6th highest percentage of the countries surveyed). In addition to that, 78.5% of Italians believed that transgender people should be legally protected from discrimination, 57.7% believed that transgender people should be allowed to use the restroom corresponding to their gender identity rather than their birth sex, and only 14.9% believed that transgender people have a mental illness (the 6th lowest of the countries surveyed).

According to Pew Research Center survey in 2015–17, 59% of Italians supported same-sex marriage, while 38% opposed. At 27%, young people aged between 18 and 34 were less likely than their elders to oppose legal gay marriage.

A survey conducted on Ipsos's Global Advisor online platform among more than 19,000 individuals in 27 countries between 23 April and 7 May 2021, found that 63% Italians aged between 18 and 74 believed that same-sex couples should be allowed to marry legally. This percentage was higher than that of some countries where, unlike in Italy, same-sex marriage is legal, such as Australia, France and United States.

Summary table

See also

Human rights in Italy
LGBT rights in Europe
LGBT rights in the European Union

References

Further reading